Huang Yali (born March 22, 1989) is a Chinese pop singer who earned sixth place in the 2006 Super Girl contest.

Biography
Huang was born and raised in the town of Yutan (now Yutan Subdistrict), Ningxiang, Hunan, China. During her childhood years, Huang developed an interest in singing and experimented with several different vocal techniques after listening to the songs of popular female singers such as Jolin Tsai and Stefanie Sun.

While still a 16-year-old student at the Number 4 High School in Ningxiang, Huang participated in the 2005 Super Girl singing contest. She won the second of the qualifying competitions in Changsha, then finished sixth in the overall competition. In 2007, Huang went to Tokyo and Singapore to study music.

Her first single was "Hudie Quanbian"(), recorded during the time she was on Super Girl. She joined EE-Media in 2005. Her debut album, titled "Baby", was released on 19 December 2006. On July 11, 2008, she joined Linfair Records Ltd. Her 2nd album, titled " I shall not Fear", was released on 19 June 2009. Her 3rd album, titled "Former Girlfriend", was released on 20 December 2010. Her 4th album, titled "Annual Ring", was released on 26 October 2012.

In 2006, she appeared in the television series "Meili Fenbei". In 2007, Her film debut was in "Hard to Get Notre Dame Tickets". In that year, she appeared in the television series "The Guy was Gorgeous".

Personal life
On July 2, 2021, in the variety show Back to Field, Huang revealed that she and her first boyfriend Wang Hao, who had been dating for 16 years, had married.

Discography

Albums

Singles

Filmography

References

External links

1989 births
Living people
People from Ningxiang
Super Girl contestants
Musicians from Changsha
Singers from Hunan